Daniel Brian Simmonds (born 17 December 1974) is an English former professional footballer. He played for Brighton & Hove Albion in the Football League, before playing non-league football for various clubs.

Career

Simmonds played youth football for Langney Sports before signing for Brighton & Hove Albion. As a trainee he played against his former club in the 1992 Sussex Senior Cup final, before playing 18 times for Albion's first team in the Football League.

He then moved on to play non-league football for Hastings United and won the Southern League Division One East title with the club in 2001–02. In 2003, he was reunited with his former Hastings boss, Garry Wilson, at Eastbourne Borough and was part of the Borough team which won the Conference South play-off before losing the North/South Conference play-off final in 2004-05. He left Eastbourne late in the 2006 season and signed for Ashford Town (Kent). In 2006, Simmonds signed for Eastbourne Town. Here he was part of the championship winning team which gained promotion from the Sussex County League to the Isthmian League in 2006–07. In 2011, he signed for Rye United, before returning to Eastbourne Town as assistant manager for a short period. In 2012, he briefly resumed his playing career by signing for Eastbourne United Association.

Honours

Hastings United (1995–2003)
Sussex Senior Challenge Cup: 1995–96
Southern League Division One East champions: 2001–02
Southern League Cup runners-up: 1999–2000

Eastbourne Borough (2003–2006)
Conference South: play-off winners 2004–05

Eastbourne Town (2006–2011)
Sussex County League champions: 2006–07

References

External links

Danny Simmonds - Association of Football Statisticians

1974 births
Living people
Sportspeople from Eastbourne
English footballers
Association football midfielders
Eastbourne Borough F.C. players
Brighton & Hove Albion F.C. players
Hastings United F.C. players
Ashford United F.C. players
Eastbourne Town F.C. players
Rye United F.C. players
Eastbourne United A.F.C. players
English Football League players
Southern Football League players
National League (English football) players
English football managers